Tipula nubeculosa is a species of cranefly. It is widespread throughout the Palaearctic, including Belgium where it can be found living in damp forest habitats. Tipula nubeculosa can reach lengths of 17-30 mm, with a wingspan of 18-23 mm. T. nubeculosa is a host species for the parasitic larvae of Admontia grandicornis.

References

 

Tipulidae
Diptera of Europe
Diptera of Asia
Insects described in 1804